Ferenc Szaszovszky (born 17 October 1973 in Budapest) is a Hungarian football player who currently plays for BVSC Budapest.

References
 Futballévkönyv 1999 [Football Yearbook 1999], Volume I, pp. 78–82., Aréna 2000 kiadó, Budapest, 2000 

1973 births
Living people
Hungarian footballers
Pécsi MFC players
Budapesti VSC footballers
Association football defenders
Footballers from Budapest